Legislative election also known as Senatorial election for the Legislature of Guam took place on November 4, 2014, coinciding with the 2014 United States elections and the Guam gubernatorial election. All 15 seats in the Legislature of Guam were up for election.

Candidates
The fifteen candidates who win the most votes go on to the General election. One incumbent seats and only senators is not seeking re-election was Ben Pangelinan to the 33rd Guam Legislature until he died in the office on July 8, 2014.

Democratic

Declared

Republican

Eliminated
Romeo Carlos

Declined

Democratic
Ben Pangelinan

Republican

Primary elections 
The members are elected at-large with the first 15 winning candidates are elected as the new members of the legislature. As there were many candidates running, primaries were set on August 30, 2014, for both the Democratic and Republican parties.

Results

Democratic primary results

Republican primary results

General Elections 
The members of the legislature are elected at-large with the first 15 winning candidates elected as the new members of the legislature. The Democrats and Republican Party had retain their seats, for the next legislature at 9 Democrats and 6 Republicans

Incoming Senators to the 33rd Guam Legislature
There were 15 senators elected on November 4, 2014 to serve in the 33rd Guam Legislature and were inaugurated on January 5, 2015:

Democratic

Incumbents

Freshman
Nerissa Bretania Underwood

Republican

Incumbents

Freshman

See also 
2018 Guam gubernatorial election
2018 Guam general election

References 

2014 elections in the United States
2014 in Guam
Legislative elections in Guam
2014 Guam elections